Sir James Thornhill (25 July 1675 or 1676 – 4 May 1734) was an English painter of historical subjects working in the Italian baroque tradition. He was responsible for some large-scale schemes of murals, including the "Painted Hall" at the Royal Hospital, Greenwich, the paintings on the inside of the dome of St Paul's Cathedral, and works at Chatsworth House and Wimpole Hall.

Life
Thornhill was born in Melcombe Regis, Dorset, the son of Walter Thornhill of Wareham and Mary, eldest daughter of Colonel William Sydenham, governor of Weymouth. In 1689 he was apprenticed to Thomas Highmore (1660–1720), a specialist in non-figurative decorative painting. He also learned a great deal from Antonio Verrio  and Louis Laguerre, two prominent foreign decorative painters then working in England.  He completed his apprenticeship in 1696 and, on 1 March 1704, became a Freeman of the Painter-Stainers' Company of London.

Decorative schemes

Thornhill decorated palace interiors with large-scale compositions, with figures commonly shown in idealized and rhetorical postures. In 1707 he was given the commission to decorate the Hall now known as the Painted Hall at the Old Royal Naval College (1707–1727). The scheme of allegorical wall and ceiling decorations of the hall depicts the Protestant succession of English monarchs from William III and Mary II to George I.

On 28 June 1715 Thornhill was awarded the commission to decorate the dome of St Paul's Cathedral by "a whig, low-church dominated committee inspired by a moral Anglican nationalism". The Archbishop of Canterbury, Thomas Tenison, is said to have remarked: "I am no judge of painting, but on two articles I think I may insist: first that the painter employed be a Protestant; and secondly that he be an Englishman". The Weekly Packet said that the decision to award Thornhill the commission would "put to silence all the loud applauses hitherto given to foreign artists". The eight scenes in the dome (1716–19), executed in grisaille, show episodes from the Life of St. Paul.

Thornhill's vast murals in great houses often related to topical events, as seen through the eyes of his mainly Whig patrons. At Chatsworth, during 1707-8 Thornhill painted a number of walls and ceilings, the most notable being the continuous wall and ceiling painting of the Sabine room, then a lobby, but since used as a bedroom. Here he painted The Rape of the Sabine Women, a vast panorama of mounted warriors carrying off the Sabine women to Rome. He chooses to feature strongly Hersilia, who was deified for her loyalty to her Roman husband, Romulus, as against her Sabine family - a deliberate reference to Mary, lauded by the Whigs for supporting her Protestant husband, William, against her Catholic father, James.

At Hanbury Hall, beneath an imposing view of both the Olympian Gods and the story of Achilles which dominates the ceiling of the main staircase, Thornhill added a small portrait of Rev Henry Sacheverell, a Tory propagandist put on trial for sedition by the Whig government in 1710, being cast to the Furies to be burnt. In 1716 Thornhill painted the ceiling of the Great Hall in Blenheim Palace for John Churchill, 1st Duke of Marlborough, newly returned to the country after being prosecuted by the Tory ministry in the last years of Queen Anne. The subject is, inevitably, the Duke's 1704 victory at the Battle of Blenheim, during the War of the Spanish Succession.

His last major commission was to paint the chapel at Wimpole Hall; he started work on the preliminary sketches in 1713 and the work was finished by 1724. The north wall has fictive architecture and four Trompe-l'œil "statues" of the four Doctors of the Church. The east wall above the altar is painted with the Adoration of the Magi.

In 1725 he offered to paint decorations for the ceiling of the New Council Chamber at the Guildhall in the City of London. He gave his services free, although he was rewarded with a valuable gold cup. The chamber was later demolished, though some of the paintings – an Allegory of London, and representations of the Cardinal Virtues, personified as naked children – survive.

Other works
In his native Dorset  Thornhill decorated the reredos at St. Mary's Church, Weymouth, with a picture of the Last Supper. Thornhill was also a notable portraitist.
He also carried out a commission in Worcestershire painting the walls and ceiling around the grand staircase at Hanbury Hall.

Drawing academies
In 1711, Thornhill was one of the twelve original directors of Sir Godfrey Kneller's academy at Great Queen Street, London. In 1716, he succeeded Kneller as Governor there and held the post until 1720. He then established his own private drawing school at Covent Garden, but this soon closed. In November 1724, Thornhill made a second, more successful, attempt to establish a new free academy in his private house at Covent Garden.

William Hogarth
William Hogarth seems to have been a member of Thornhill's second academy from the beginning. On 23 March 1729 he married Thornhill's daughter Jane. Thornhill was with Hogarth when he went to see Sarah Malcolm in Newgate prison just days before her execution. This was in order that Hogarth might record her portrait.

Honours
In June 1718 George I made Thornhill court painter, and in March 1720 Serjeant Painter, succeeding his former master Highmore in the latter role. On 2 May 1720, the king knighted him, the first native artist to be knighted. In the same year, he was master of the Painters' Company and in 1723 fellow of the Royal Society.

Political career
Thornhill was returned unopposed as Member of Parliament for Melcombe Regis at the 1722 British general election. He was returned in a contest at the 1727 British general election. During his time, he voted regularly with the Government. He presented to the church an altarpiece painted by himself.

Houses and architecture
In 1718 Thornhill took a large house on Covent Garden Piazza, and in 1725 he renovated Thornhill House in the south of Stalbridge, near Sturminster Newton, Dorset, in the Palladian manner.

In 1720 he tried his hand at architecture. Along with Giacomo Leoni, he designed Moor Park, for which he also painted the entrance hall ceiling and other rooms.

Raphael cartoons
Towards the end of his life Thornhill was receiving no major commissions, so he began to copy the Raphael Cartoons, then at Hampton Court. Apart from full-size copies, completed in 1731, he made 162 smaller studies of heads, hands and feet intending to publish them in printed form for the use of art students, but left this work unfinished at his death. The original small wash designs of details of the cartoons are now in the collection of the Victoria and Albert Museum, London.

Thornhill's copies of the cartoons were sold by auction by Christopher Cock on 24 and 25 February 1735 at his room in the Great Piazza, Covent Garden.

Gallery of Thornhill's work

References

General
Barber, Tabitha, ‘Thornhill, Sir James  (1675/6–1734)’, Oxford Dictionary of National Biography, Oxford University Press,  2004; online edn, Jan 2008, accessed 23 Sept 2010.

Raffaele De Giorgi, "Couleur, couleur!". Antonio Verrio: un pittore in Europa tra Seicento e Settecento (Edifir, Firenze 2009).

Further reading
Memorial of Sir James Thornhill (The Gentleman's Magazine and Historical Chronicle, Volume 195, Jan 1855) p486 ff.
Sir James Thornhill (Dictionary of National Biography, 1885–1900, Volume 57).

External links

James Thornhill biography (The Dorset Page)

17th-century English painters
English male painters
18th-century English painters
18th-century English male artists
History painters
Knights Bachelor
Freemasons of the Premier Grand Lodge of England
Members of the Parliament of Great Britain for English constituencies
People from Weymouth, Dorset
Fellows of the Royal Society
1675 births
1676 births
1734 deaths
Court painters